Milk Creek Glacier is in the U.S. state of Oregon. The glacier is situated in the Cascade Range on the west slope of Mount Jefferson. Milk Creek Glacier is considered stagnant ice and is located immediately west and below the summit of Mount Jefferson.

See also
 List of glaciers in the United States

References

Glaciers of Mount Jefferson
Glaciers of Linn County, Oregon
Glaciers of Oregon